Burgwyn is a surname. Notable people with the surname include:

H. James Burgwyn (born 1936), American historian
Henry K. Burgwyn (1841–1863), Confederate colonel in the American Civil War, killed at the Battle of Gettysburg
Mebane Holoman Burgwyn (1914–1992), American award-winning author of children's books
Walter Burgwyn Jones (1888–1963), American judge, legislator, and writer

See also
Burgan (disambiguation)
Burgen (disambiguation)
Burgin (disambiguation)
Burgon